The Austin Light Twelve-Four is a car that was produced by Austin from 1933 until 1939. It was replaced in 1939 by a completely new car also called the Austin 12 which kept the same engine. The "12" in the name referred to the taxation horsepower, a British rating which controlled the annual taxation payable to use the car on the road.

Austin Twelve-Four Ascot
Austin introduced this new car in September 1932. It was made by fitting a 1535 cc side-valve, four-cylinder engine with 24 bhp output into the same chassis as they had been making since late 1930 for their six-cylinder 12/6 which was also in the same 12 hp class. This new four cylinder engine was coupled to a four-speed "crash" gearbox at first, but a new transmission with synchromesh on third and top speed appeared in 1934 and then also on second in 1935.

The chassis was very conventional, with semi-elliptic leaf springs on all wheels and rigid axles front and rear. Wire wheels were fitted until 1937 when they were replaced with pressed steel ones. At launch there was a choice of a pressed steel six-light (three windows on each side) saloon called the Harley and a two-seat tourer.  A second saloon style with a boot, the Ascot, was added in 1934 and the Harley was dropped in 1935. In the same year the chromium-plated radiator shell was replaced by one painted in body colour. The very early cars had their side lights mounted on the scuttle, but these soon moved to the tops of the wings.

Austin Twelve New Ascot
On 11 August 1936 Austin announced a major update for 1937 with the engine being moved forward on the chassis to improve passenger space. Other improvements included an adjustable steering column and the windscreen wipers moving to the scuttle from the top of the screen. The bodies became much more rounded and in 1938 an estate car was added to the model line-up and the tourer, which was still being built in the old style, was replaced by a four-door cabriolet.

for 1939
Higher and wider doors were introduced for both Twelve and Fourteen in midsummer 1938.

References

12 4
1930s cars
Cars introduced in 1933